Haukeli (or historically Haukeligrend) is a village in Vinje Municipality in Vestfold og Telemark county, Norway. The village is located up in the Haukelifjell mountains, just south of the Hardangervidda National Park and immediately west of the village of Edland. Haukeli is where Norwegian National Road 9 and European route E134 meet. It is the last larger village heading west before going over the mountain pass and entering Western Norway. Prior to 1999, the area was called Haukeligrend.

Popular activities in the area are fishing, hunting, hiking, and skiing.

Some of the rivers around Haukeli have been dammed to produce hydropower. Development started in 1957 with the construction of the Haukeli Power Station and was finished in 1979 when the system was all completed.

References

External links

 Visit Haukeli

Vinje
Villages in Vestfold og Telemark